Ephedra strobilacea is a species of Ephedra that is native to Iran and Central Asia (Afghanistan, Tajikistan, Turkmenistan, Uzbekistan).

Taxonomy
It was originally described by Alexander G. von Bunge in 1852 and placed in section Alatae, tribe Tropidolepides by Otto Stapf in 1889. In 1996 Robert A. Price left E. strobilacea in section Alatae without recognizing a tribe.

References 

strobilacea
Flora of Central Asia
Plants described in 1852
Taxa named by Alexander von Bunge